Carlos Avellán (born 31 May 1982) is an Ecuadorian former professional tennis player.

A native of Guayaquil, Avellán made his debut for the Ecuador Davis Cup team in 2002 and broke through for his first ITF Futures title the following year. During his career he won four ITF Futures titles for singles and earned a career high ranking of 306. He made his last Davis Cup appearance in 2009, retiring with nine singles and six doubles wins.

ITF Futures titles

Singles: (4)

Doubles: (3)

See also
List of Ecuador Davis Cup team representatives

References

External links
 
 
 

1982 births
Living people
Ecuadorian male tennis players
Sportspeople from Guayaquil
Tennis players at the 2003 Pan American Games
Pan American Games competitors for Ecuador